A tree planting bar or dibble bar is a tool used by foresters to plant trees, especially in large-scale afforestation or reforestation. It is very ergonomic, as it greatly speeds up the planting and prevents back pain.

Pointed planting bars are better for rockier soils.

See also
Pottiputki
Hoe (tool)
Dibber

References

External links

Forestry tools
Tools